Felice (Cino) delle Piane is an Italian art historian who focuses on Khmer sculptures. He was born in Genoa, Italy on November 17, 1940, and has lived for over 30 years in Thailand.

He curated various Khmer sculpture exhibitions in the Melzi di Cusano Palace in Milan from 1993 to 1999. In 2001 he curated another Khmer sculpture exhibition for a museum and wrote another art catalog with contemporary artists like Mark Tobey and Eduardo Chillida, in Valencia, Spain. Felice has devoted a great part of his life to research on the sculptures of Khmer and their culture.

Publications
2001: La espiritualidad del vacio, Khmer sculpture exhibition catalog, Obrasocial Bancaja, Valencia, Spain.
2002: The Universal values of Khmer sculpture, Absolute Marbella Magazine, Marbella, Spain.
2002: Khmer masterpieces exhibition catalog, Hachmeister galerie, Munster, Germany.

See also
Eastern art history
Madeleine Giteau
Henri Mouhot

External links

Published references:
Gallery, Museum Khmer sculpture Catalogues:
 Khmer Art Exhibition
 Khmer Art Felice delle Piane catalogs, Hachmeister galerie, Munster, Germany.

1940 births
Historians of Southeast Asia
Italian art curators
Living people
Italian expatriates in Thailand